The black-backed shrew mole (Uropsilus atronates) is a species of mammal in the family Talpidae. It is endemic to China, where it is only known from the vicinity of Mucheng in Yunnan Province.

It was first named as a subspecies of Anderson's shrew mole, Rhynchonax andersoni atronates, by Glover Morrill Allen in 1923. Later it was considered synonymous with the gracile shrew mole (U. gracilis), but a 2018 phylogenetic study found it to be a distinct species. The study found it to be sister species to a clade comprising U. gracilis and a putative undescribed species of Uropsilus. Both groups likely diverged during the early-mid Pleistocene.

References 

Uropsilus
Mammals of China
Endemic fauna of Yunnan
Mammals described in 1925
Taxa named by Glover Morrill Allen